, there are 19 known disc golf courses in Austria on the official PDGA Course Directory. 10 of them (%) are full-size courses with 18 holes or more, and 8 of them (%) are smaller courses that feature at least 9 holes. Austria has  courses per million inhabitants.

See also 
List of disc golf courses in Norway

Notes

References

External links 
 Disc Golf Austria Course Directory

 
Austria
Disc golf courses
Disc golf courses